Clark Peak is the highest summit of the Medicine Bow Mountains range of the Rocky Mountains of North America. Clark Peak is the highest point of Jackson County and the entire drainage basin of the North Platte River.

Mountain

See also

List of mountain peaks of Colorado
List of the most prominent summits of Colorado
List of Colorado county high points

References

External links

Mountains of Colorado
Mountains of Jackson County, Colorado
Mountains of Larimer County, Colorado
Routt National Forest
North American 3000 m summits